The Lightweight TT is a motorcycle road race that is a part of the Isle of Man TT festival - an annual motorcycle event traditionally held over the last week of May and first week of June.

History
The Lightweight class was first present at the 1920 TT races, as a category in the Junior TT. However it was not until 1922 that the first time the Lightweight TT took place, won by Geoff S. Davison riding a Levis, at an average speed of 49.89 mph (80.29 km/h) for 5 laps of the Snaefell Mountain Course.
Between 1949 and 1976, the Lightweight race was part of the Grand Prix motorcycle racing season.

The event was dropped from the 2005 race calendar due to lack of entries. The Lightweight TT and the Ultra-Lightweight TT were later reinstated to the 2008 & 2009 race schedules, but were held on the 4.25 mile Billown Circuit in the south of the Isle of Man. For the 2010 races, the Lightweight TT was again dropped from the race schedule on cost grounds. 

The event was re-introduced for the 2012 races on the Mountain course, with a change to water-cooled four-stroke twin cylinder engines not exceeding 650 cc and complying with the ACU Standing Regulations.

The Lightweight category
There have been several different categories of motorcycle that can compete in this event. In the 1950s and 1960s, the principal TT solo events were the Senior (500 cc), Junior (350 cc), and Lightweight (250 cc, or sometimes 125 cc). The 125 cc class was occasionally called the "Ultra-Lightweight" class.

Currently the Lightweight class comprises road-based "Super-Twin" solo machines with liquid-cooled four-stroke engines  of up to 650 cc engine capacity.

Eligibility

Entrants
 Entrants must be in possession of a valid National Entrants or FIM Sponsors Licence for Road Racing.

Machines
The 2012 specification for entries into the Lightweight TT race are defined as;-
 Any solo machine complying with the following specifications:
 Machines must comply with general technical rules as per ACU Standing Regulations and 2012 IOM TT regulations.
 Any four-stroke twin cylinder motor-cycle originally sold for road use with a water-cooled engine of up to 650cc.
 Eligible machines must be from models homologated for road use 2005 or later.

Official Qualification Time
 115% of the time set by the third fastest qualifier in the class.

Speed and lap records
The lap record for the Lightweight TT is held by Michael Dunlop in a time of 18 minutes and 26.543 seconds, at an average speed of  set during the 2018 race.

List of Lightweight TT Winners

Race winners (riders)

See also
TT Zero
Ultra-Lightweight TT
Sidecar TT
Junior TT
Senior TT

References